Paride is a masculine Italian given name. Notable people with the name include:

Paride Grillo (born 1982), Italian cyclist
Paride Milianti (born 1934), Italian alpine skier
Paride Suzzara Verdi (1826–1879), Italian patriot, journalist and politician
Paride Taban (born 1936), South Sudanese Roman Catholic bishop
Paride Tumburus (1939–2015), Italian footballer

See also
Il Paride, a 1662 Italian opera
Parides, a genus of swallowtail butterflies

Italian masculine given names